Chipolina is a surname. People with the surname include:

 Joseph Chipolina (born 1987), Gibraltarian footballer and admin clerk
 Kenneth Chipolina (born 1994), Gibraltarian footballer
 Roy Chipolina (born 1983), Gibraltarian footballer and customs officer
 Eric Chipolina (born 1972), French computer engineer